The Mid-Southern Conference is a ten-member IHSAA-Sanctioned Athletic Conference within the South Central Indiana counties of Clark, Harrison, Jackson, Scott, and Washington.

History
The conference began in 1958, with seven schools leaving the Southeastern Indiana Conference and allying with three schools from Clark County (whose previous conference affiliations are in need of research). The first decade-plus within the league was stable, as the only change was Brownstown becoming Brownstown Central due to consolidation in Jackson County. Meanwhile, the 1970s proved to be a comparatively tumultuous decade. Mitchell joined the Blue Chip Conference in 1970, seeking for conference rivals to the west. They were replaced by Floyd Central, which had been independent since forming three years earlier. Austin, which did not sponsor football, joined the Southern Athletic Conference in 1974 while maintaining MSC membership. This allowed the Eagles to ally themselves with other non-football schools, yet maintain the traditional rivalries from the SEIC. Silver Creek also did not have football, while Scottsburg dropped it in the 1970s, yet they were much larger than most schools that didn't offer the sport. In 2014 they reinstated the football program.

Floyd Central grew much faster than anticipated, and by 1976 had outgrown the other schools, necessitating a move to the Hoosier Hills Conference. This marked the first time membership had dropped below ten schools, though this would only last for two years. North Harrison, a school that had outgrown the small-school Blue River Conference and was within the MSC footprint, joined after starting their football team, bring the league back to 10 schools with seven football-playing members.

Paoli was the next school to make a change, becoming a charter member of the Patoka Lake Conference while maintaining MSC membership. This lasted for six years, as Paoli decided the more geographically compact PLC was better suited to their needs, leaving the Mid-Southern in 1985. There was concern that Austin would also leave, being the other dual-conference member, but Austin would instead leave the SAC in 1987 being by far the largest school in the Southern, as well as being competitively dominant. The conference would stay with a nine school, six football team setup for 16 years, the longest period of stability since the league was founded.

The conference once again moved to ten members when Eastern (Pekin) decided to start a football team in the early 2000s. They had grown not only to the point where football was feasible, but also too large for the Southern, and joined the MAC in 2003. The number of football schools would move from six to eight by the end of the decade. Eastern would unveil their football team in 2007, while Silver Creek would start their own team in 2010.

Current Mid-Southern Conference standings, schedules and information can be located at www.mscsports.org; launched beginning the fall of 2014, the site will soon include an abundance of archived information.

Membership

 Austin was also a member of the Southern Athletic Conference from 1974 to 1987.

Former Members

 Paoli was also a member of the Patoka Lake Conference from 1979 until it left the MSC in 1985.

Conference Champions
Asterisks denote split championships.

Football

 Scottsburg dropped football after the 1983 season, but revived the sport in 2017. Eastern began their football program in 2007, and Silver Creek in 2011.

Boys Basketball

Girls Basketball

Resources 
 IHSAA Conferences
 IHSAA Directory

Indiana high school athletic conferences
High school sports conferences and leagues in the United States